Mammet Orazmuhammedow (born 20 December 1986) is a Turkmen footballer, who plays as a goalkeeper for FC Altyn Asyr and Turkmenistan.  He made his debut for the national team during the 2012 AFC Challenge Cup.

Career statistics

International

Statistics accurate as of match played 17 January 2019

References

External links 
 

Living people
1986 births
Turkmenistan footballers
Turkmenistan international footballers
Association football goalkeepers
Place of birth missing (living people)
FC Altyn Asyr players
2019 AFC Asian Cup players